Richard Sanderson Keen, Baron Keen of Elie  (born 29 March 1954) is a British lawyer and Conservative Party politician. He was Advocate General for Scotland from May 2015 until his resignation on 16 September 2020.

Early life
Keen was educated at The King's School, Rochester and Dollar Academy, and graduated LLB (with Honours) in law from the University of Edinburgh in 1976, where he was a Beckman scholar. He was admitted to the Faculty of Advocates in 1980 and took silk (QC) in 1993. He was admitted to the Bar of England and Wales in 2009 and elected a Bencher of the Middle Temple in 2011.

Legal career
Keen served as standing junior counsel in Scotland to the Department of Trade and Industry from 1986–93. He specialises in commercial law, property law and administrative law. He is also a member of Blackstone Chambers in Middle Temple, London.

He defended Al Amin Khalifa Fhimah at the Pan Am Flight 103 bombing trial, with Fhimah being acquitted of all charges. In 2007, he represented Henri Paul's family at the inquest into the death of Diana, Princess of Wales.

He represented Andy Coulson in relation to perjury charges.

He has regularly appeared in the Supreme Court of the United Kingdom. In 2016, he appeared for the United Kingdom Government in the R (Miller) v Secretary of State for Exiting the European Union ("Article 50 case") where he successfully argued that there was no constitutional requirement for the devolved administrations to consent to Brexit.

Keen was elected Dean of the Faculty of Advocates (leader of the Scottish Bar) in 2007.  He remained Dean until January 2014 when he resigned to become chair of the Scottish Conservative Party.

He was appointed the Advocate General for Scotland on 29 May 2015, and stepped down as chair of the Scottish Conservative Party. In May 2016 he was also appointed Lords Minister for the Ministry of Justice with policy responsibility for civil justice in England and Wales and regulation and promotion of the legal profession in England and Wales. In September 2017, he was appointed Minister for the Crown Dependencies.

Keen was created a Life Peer on 8 June 2015 taking the title Baron Keen of Elie, of Elie in Fife. On 15 November 2017 Lord Keen was sworn as a Member of the Privy Council.

On 16 September 2020, Keen offered his resignation over the United Kingdom Internal Market Bill, stating that he found it difficult to reconcile parts of it with the law.

On 12 January 2022 Keen was appointed a member of the UK delegation to the Parliamentary Assembly of the Council of Europe at Strasbourg.

Personal life
Keen is married and has two children. He was reported to be one of the highest earners in Scotland, being featured on a list of the top 100 earners in 2003. In 2017, Keen was charged with contravening section two of the Firearms Act 1968 by failing to safely secure a shotgun, to which he pleaded guilty and was fined the sum of £1,000. A hearing of the Bar Tribunals and Adjudication Service in 2019 found that the offence constituted a breach of standards, but did not amount to professional misconduct.

References

1954 births
Living people
Deans of the Faculty of Advocates
Alumni of the University of Edinburgh
People from Rochester, Kent
People educated at Dollar Academy
Scottish King's Counsel
People educated at King's School, Rochester
Scottish Conservative Party politicians
Advocates General for Scotland
Conservative Party (UK) life peers
Life peers created by Elizabeth II
20th-century King's Counsel
Members of the Privy Council of the United Kingdom